Gottfried Trachsel (5 October 1907 – 15 June 1974) was a Swiss equestrian. He placed fourth in individual dressage, won a silver medal in team dressage at the 1952 Summer Olympics in Helsinki, and a won bronze medal in team dressage at the 1956 Summer Olympics.

References

External links
 

1907 births
1974 deaths
Swiss male equestrians
Swiss dressage riders
Olympic equestrians of Switzerland
Olympic silver medalists for Switzerland
Olympic bronze medalists for Switzerland
Equestrians at the 1952 Summer Olympics
Equestrians at the 1956 Summer Olympics
Olympic medalists in equestrian
Medalists at the 1956 Summer Olympics
Medalists at the 1952 Summer Olympics
20th-century Swiss people